Part Timers is a sitcom-dramedy web series, created by and starring YouTube comedy duo Ian Hecox and Anthony Padilla, otherwise known as Smosh. It is Smosh's first scripted series, and is loosely based on Hecox's own real-life experiences as a part-timer. As usual with Smosh's content, each episodes usually ran from ten-to-twelve minutes long, is uploaded to Smosh's main channel, and features a behind-the-scenes footage the day after.

It premiered on January 11, 2016, and ran for 2 seasons subsequently, with the series being entirely directed by Laura Murphy. Its last episode premiered on April 30, 2016.

Premise
Part Timers centers around the antics of the part-time employees of Pork E. Pine's, a run-down children's pizzeria and arcade, and is loosely based on Hecox's own experiences working at Chuck E. Cheese, prior to his YouTube fame. The series features Smosh as Pork E. Pine's hapless manager Anton (Padilla), who got the position with the help of his father despite his obvious lack of experience in the job, and his friend Ian (Hecox), the Pork E. Pine mascot. Also featured are Pete (Noah Grossman), a socially inept recent hire who harbours feelings for his somewhat neurotic colleague, Mads (Cat Alter), who works on the cleanup crew; Dinger (Casey Webb), an eccentric comic book nerd who mans the arcade prize booth; Lori (Natalie Whittle), the restaurant supervisor and the only level-headed member of staff; and Ella (Jade Martz), a ditzy, overly friendly employee with financial problems.

Cast
 Ian Hecox as Ian, the man who works as Porky, the mascot of Pork E. Pines. 
 Anthony Padilla as Anton, the new owner of Pork E. Pines, as it was given to him by his father. 
 Casey Webb as Dinger, the man who runs the Pork E. Pines' prize booth. He's been there longer than any of the other employees.
 Jade Martz as Ella, a homeless woman that the pizzeria found in an alley and hired.
 Natalie Whittle as Lori, a woman seems to be the pizzeria's most level headed employee and is the assistant manager.
 Cat Alter as Mads, the woman works as the pizzeria's cleanup crew. She develops feelings for Pete. The series ends with her death from falling off the restaurant roof, and being run over by a car. She becomes a ghost and Pete has to have sex with her to set her free.
 Noah Grossman as Pete, Pork E. Pines' newest employee who develops a crush on Mads.

Episodes

Season 1
The first season was announced with a trailer on January 4, 2016, and premiered on January 11. The season finale aired on March 21.

Season 2
The second season was announced in a trailer on March 28, 2016, and premiered on April 4. The season and series concluded on May 30.

References

2016 web series debuts
2016 web series endings
YouTube original programming